Yulenny Guylaine Cortés León (born 18 April 1976) is a Mexican politician from the National Action Party. From 2009 to 2012, she was a deputy in the LXI Legislature of the Mexican Congress, representing Colima.

References

1976 births
Living people
Politicians from Colima
Women members of the Chamber of Deputies (Mexico)
National Action Party (Mexico) politicians
21st-century Mexican politicians
21st-century Mexican women politicians
Deputies of the LXI Legislature of Mexico
Members of the Chamber of Deputies (Mexico) for Colima